Vasile Iorga (19 February 1945 – April 2003) was a Romanian wrestler who competed in the 1972 Summer Olympics and in the 1976 Summer Olympics.

References

External links
 

1945 births
2003 deaths
Olympic wrestlers of Romania
Wrestlers at the 1972 Summer Olympics
Wrestlers at the 1976 Summer Olympics
Romanian male sport wrestlers
Olympic bronze medalists for Romania
Olympic medalists in wrestling
Medalists at the 1972 Summer Olympics
20th-century Romanian people